San Marcial was a community in Socorro County, New Mexico, United States, founded in 1854 and survivor of two floods and a fire, but is now a ghost town, a deserted site with little left of the original town, destroyed in a great flood in 1929.

History

Foundation

San Marcial was founded circa 1854 by Pascual Joyla, who built a house on the east side of the Rio Grande and began selling produce and firewood in Fort Conrad, to the north. A small community grew up around Joyla's house, taking its name from the third century Frenchman, Saint Martial of Limoges. A flood wiped out the village in 1866, and the people relocated to the other side of the river.

In July 1881, a fire almost completely destroyed the new community.

The town was rebuilt, and became a center for the surrounding irrigated farms,

Prosperity

When the railway passed through the area in the 1880s, a new community initially called "New San Marcial" developed near the railway station to the west.
This later obtained the Post Office name of San Marcial. Between 1890 and 1920, San Marcial was the second largest town in Socorro County.
San Marcial attained a population of about 1,400 by 1929.

In 1917, the villages to the south of the community were ordered to evacuate, since they would be flooded by the Elephant Butte Reservoir. Many of them moved to San Marcial or to Val Verde. In 1920, a flood caused great destruction in the region, leaving many homeless. After this, much work was spent on flood defenses.

Abandonment

On 13 August 1929, following heavy rain, there was a massive flood in the area.  According to the Socorro Chieftain of 17 August 1929: 

Some residents tried to rebuild after the August 13 flood, but a second flood on September 23 put an end the town. The main employer, the Santa Fe Railroad, had enough and pulled out.  Without the trains and the Harvey House, there was no reason for anyone to stay, although as late as the 1930 census a few people lingered on.

Today, a cemetery remains the only obvious sign of the former settlement, although parts of the Santa Fe Railroad's roundhouse can still be found if one knows where to look.

External links 
 San Marcial Floods

References
Citations

Sources

Geography of Socorro County, New Mexico
Ghost towns in New Mexico